The Berkeley Hunt is a foxhound pack in the west of England. Its country lies in the southern part of Gloucestershire, between Gloucester and Bristol.

History

The Berkeley Hunt's establishment is said to have been, in its (18th century) day, one of the largest and most important the world has ever known. Hounds have been kept at Berkeley Castle since the 12th century, at first to hunt the stag and the buck, and since the 18th century, to hunt the fox. The Berkeley family of Berkeley Castle (which lost its titles of Baron Berkeley and Earl of Berkeley in 1882 and 1942 respectively) still owns the Berkeley hounds and the kennels.

Country
The "hill country" above Dursley and Wotton-under-Edge is hunted mainly in March and early April, and adjoins the Duke of Beaufort's estate.  The "vale country" comprises the Vale of Berkeley, largely dairy and stock farms with much permanent pasture, although the use of this land for growing crops is increasing.

Relationship with the Old Berkeley Hunt
At one time the Berkeley Hunt's hounds were kennelled at Berkeley and at Cheltenham, Nettlebed, Gerrards Cross and Cranford, Middlesex. It should have been possible to hunt from Berkeley Castle to Wormwood Scrubs, 100 miles as the crow flies, although not on a regular basis without disturbing other hunts. This wide range of activity may have begun by the Berkeleys taking their hounds to London each year. In the late 18th century, the fifth Earl of Berkeley lost most of his land in and around Middlesex.

The country around Cheltenham and Broadway became Cotswold, North Cotswold and Cotswold Vale Farmer's Hunt. Gerrards Cross and Cranford retained the old livery and became known as the Old Berkeley Hunt. They were later divided into East and West.

After the Hunting Act
Although "hunting wild mammals with a dog" was made unlawful in England and Wales by the Hunting Act 2004, which came into effect in 2005, a number of exemptions stated in Schedule 1 of the 2004 Act permit some previously unusual forms of hunting wild mammals with dogs to continue, such as "hunting... for the purpose of enabling a bird of prey to hunt the wild mammal". The Berkeley stresses that its present-day hunting is within the exemptions permitted by law and the death of any fox is absolutely accidental and coincidental to its legal activities and definitely not the purpose of said activities.
However, the hunt has been witnessed to trespass on farmland which they are aware they are not permitted to be on. This shows that the hounds are not following a pre-laid trail and foxes are being deliberately hunted and killed.

Lending a name
 The Old Berkeley Hunt developed a large following among the prosperous London middle classes:
 The slang term "berk" is a contraction of "Berkeley Hunt", which in turn refers to the English vulgarity "cunt" (the usage is dated to the 1930s). It is an example of Cockney rhyming slang. The "berk" in Berkeley is pronounced , but in Cockney it is pronounced , as in American English.
 The Hunt-class mine countermeasure vessel HMS Berkeley was named after the hunt.
 Berkeley Square in London is named after the family. Berkeley House in Piccadilly was sold in 1696 to the Duke of Devonshire, who demolished it to build Devonshire House.

References

External links
 
 

Fox hunts in England
Fox hunts in the United Kingdom
South Gloucestershire District
Sport in Gloucestershire